Eddie Jerome Vedder (born Edward Louis Severson III; December 23, 1964) is an American singer, musician, and songwriter best known as the lead vocalist and one of three guitarists of the rock band Pearl Jam. He also appeared as a guest vocalist in Temple of the Dog, the one-off tribute band dedicated to the late singer Andrew Wood.

Vedder is known for his powerful baritone vocals. He was ranked number 7 on a list of "Best Lead Singers of All Time", based on a readers' poll compiled by Rolling Stone.

In 2007, Vedder released his first solo album as a soundtrack for the film Into the Wild (2007). His second album, Ukulele Songs, and a live DVD titled Water on the Road were released in 2011. His third solo album Earthling was released in 2022.

In 2017, Vedder was inducted into the Rock and Roll Hall of Fame as a member of Pearl Jam.

Early life
Vedder was born Edward Louis Severson III in the Chicago suburb of Evanston, Illinois, on December 23, 1964, to Karen Lee Vedder and Edward Louis Severson Jr. His parents divorced in 1965 when Vedder was an infant. His mother soon remarried to a man named Peter Mueller. Vedder was raised believing that Mueller was his biological father, and he went by the name Edward Mueller for a time. Vedder's ancestry includes Norwegian (Severson) and Dutch, German, and Danish (Vedder).

While living in Evanston, Vedder's family fostered seven younger children in a group home. In the mid-1970s, the family, including Vedder's three younger half-brothers, moved to San Diego County, California. It was at this point that Vedder, who received a guitar from his mother on his 12th birthday, began turning to music (as well as surfing) as a source of comfort. He particularly found solace in The Who's 1973 album, Quadrophenia. He said, "When I was around 15 or 16... I was all alone—except for music." His mother and Mueller divorced when Vedder was in his late teens. His mother and brothers moved back to the Chicago area, but Vedder remained with his stepfather in California so he would not have to change schools.

After the divorce, Vedder learned the truth about his parentage: Mueller was really his stepfather. Vedder had met his biological father briefly as a child, but had believed that Severson was merely an old friend of his parents. By the time Vedder learned the truth, Severson had died of multiple sclerosis. During his senior year at San Dieguito High School, Vedder moved out to live in an apartment, supporting himself with a nightly job at a drug store in Encinitas. Because of the pressure of work and school, Vedder dropped out of high school. He joined the rest of his family in Chicago, and at this time he changed his name to Vedder, his mother's maiden name.

In the early 1980s, while working as a waiter, Eddie earned his high school GED, and briefly attended a community college near Chicago. In 1984, Vedder returned to San Diego, with his girlfriend Beth Liebling and his friend Frank. He kept busy recording demo tapes at his home and working various jobs, including a position as a contracted security guard at the La Valencia Hotel in La Jolla. Vedder had several stints in San Diego area bands, including Surf and Destroy and the Butts. One of those bands, called Indian Style, included future Rage Against the Machine and Audioslave drummer Brad Wilk. In 1988, Vedder became the vocalist for San Diego progressive funk rock band Bad Radio. The band's original incarnation was influenced by Duran Duran; however, after Vedder joined, the band moved on to a more alternative rock sound influenced by the Red Hot Chili Peppers.

Temple of the Dog

In the 1980s, Vedder worked part time as a night attendant at a local gas station. Through the Southern California music scene, Vedder met former Red Hot Chili Peppers drummer Jack Irons, who became a friend of Vedder and would play basketball with him. Later in 1990, Irons gave him the demo tape of a Seattle band looking for a singer. Vedder listened to the tape shortly before going surfing, where lyrics came to him. He wrote lyrics for three of the songs in what he later described as a "mini-opera" entitled Momma-Son. The songs tell the story of a young man who, like Vedder, learns that he had been lied to about his paternity and that his real father is dead, grows up to become a serial killer, and is eventually imprisoned and sentenced to death. Vedder recorded vocals for the three songs, and mailed the demo tape back to Seattle. The three songs would later become Pearl Jam's "Alive", "Once", and "Footsteps".

After hearing Vedder's tape, former Mother Love Bone members Stone Gossard and Jeff Ament invited Vedder to come to Seattle to audition for their new band. They were instantly impressed with his unique sound. At the time, Gossard and Ament were working on the Temple of the Dog project founded by Soundgarden's Chris Cornell as a musical tribute to Mother Love Bone's frontman Andrew Wood, who died of a heroin overdose at age 24. Soundgarden drummer Matt Cameron and newcomer Mike McCready were also a part of the project. The song "Hunger Strike" became a duet between Cornell and Vedder. Cornell later said of Vedder that "he sang half of that song not even knowing that I'd wanted the part to be there and he sang it exactly the way I was thinking about doing it, just instinctively." Vedder would provide background vocals on several other songs as well. In April 1991, Temple of the Dog was released through A&M Records. "Hunger Strike" became Temple of the Dog's breakout single; it was also Vedder's first featured vocal on a record. Vedder said about the song in the 2009 book Grunge Is Dead; "I really like hearing that song. I feel like I could be real proud of it –  because one, I didn't write it, and two, it was such a nice way to be ushered onto vinyl for the first time. I'm indebted to Chris [Cornell] time eternal for being invited onto that track." On the 2011 documentary Pearl Jam Twenty, Vedder stated; "That was the first time I heard myself on a real record. It could be one of my favorite songs that I've ever been on – or the most meaningful." Vedder and Cornell performed the song together for the last time on October 26, 2014, at the Bridge School Benefit.

Pearl Jam

Pearl Jam was formed in 1990 by Ament, Gossard, and McCready, who then recruited Vedder and three different drummers in sequence. The band originally took the name Mookie Blaylock, but was forced to change it when they signed to Epic Records in 1991, instead calling their debut album Ten after Blaylock's jersey number.

Ten brought the band into the mainstream, and became one of the best selling alternative albums of the 1990s, being certified 13× Platinum. The band found itself amidst the sudden popularity and attention given to the Seattle music scene and the genre known as grunge. The single "Jeremy" received Grammy Award nominations for Best Rock Song and Best Hard Rock Performance in 1993. Pearl Jam received four awards at the 1993 MTV Video Music Awards for its music video for "Jeremy", including Video of the Year and Best Group Video. Ten ranks number 209 on Rolling Stone magazine's list of the 500 greatest albums of all time, and "Jeremy" was ranked number 11 on VH1's list of the 100 greatest songs of the '90s.

Following an intense touring schedule, the band went into the studio to record what would become its second studio album, Vs., released in 1993. Upon its release, Vs. set the record at the time for most copies of an album sold in a week, and spent five weeks at number one on the Billboard 200. Vs. was nominated for a Grammy Award for Best Rock Album in 1995. From Vs., the song "Daughter" received a Grammy nomination for Best Rock Performance by a Duo or Group with Vocal and the song "Go" received a Grammy nomination for Best Hard Rock Performance.

Feeling the pressures of success, with much of the burden of Pearl Jam's popularity falling on Vedder, the band decided to decrease the level of promotion for its albums, including refusing to release music videos. Vedder's issue with fame came from what he stated as "what happens when a lot of these people start thinking you can change their lives or save their lives or whatever and create these impossible fuckin' expectations that in the end just start tearing you apart." In 1994, the band began a much-publicized boycott of Ticketmaster, which lasted for three years and limited the band's ability to tour in the United States. Vedder faced what he called a "pretty intense stalker problem" during the mid-1990s. Vedder would refer to the issue in the song "Lukin" from No Code.

Later that same year the band released its third studio album, Vitalogy, which became the band's third straight album to reach multi-platinum status. It was at this time that Vedder began to be featured more on rhythm guitar, as well as on back up vocals and some drumming. The pressure of fame is a common theme of Vedder's songs on the album. The album received Grammy nominations for Album of the Year and Best Rock Album in 1996. Vitalogy was ranked number 485 on Rolling Stone magazine's list of the 500 greatest albums of all time. The lead single "Spin the Black Circle" won a Grammy Award in 1996 for Best Hard Rock Performance. Although Dave Abbruzzese performed on the album Vitalogy, he was fired in August 1994, four months before the album was released. The band cited political differences between Abbruzzese and the other members; for example, he disagreed with the Ticketmaster boycott. He was replaced by Jack Irons, a close friend of Vedder and the former and original drummer of the Red Hot Chili Peppers.

Regarding the approach Pearl Jam took after its initial success, Vedder stated, "We've had the luxury of writing our own job description...and that description has basically been cut down to just one line: make music." The band subsequently released No Code in 1996 and Yield in 1998. In 1998, prior to Pearl Jam's U.S. Yield Tour, Irons left the band due to dissatisfaction with touring. Pearl Jam enlisted former Soundgarden drummer Matt Cameron as Irons' replacement on an initially temporary basis, but he soon became the permanent replacement for Irons. "Do the Evolution" (from Yield) received a Grammy nomination for Best Hard Rock Performance. In 1998, Pearl Jam recorded "Last Kiss", a cover of a 1960s ballad made famous by J. Frank Wilson and the Cavaliers. It was released on the band's 1998 fan club Christmas single; however, by popular demand, the cover was released to the public as a single in 1999. "Last Kiss" peaked at number two on the Billboard charts and became the band's highest-charting single.

In 2000, the band released its sixth studio album, Binaural, and initiated a successful and ongoing series of official bootlegs. The band released seventy-two such live albums in 2000 and 2001, and set a record for most albums to debut in the Billboard 200 at the same time. "Grievance" (from Binaural) received a Grammy nomination for Best Hard Rock Performance. The band released its seventh studio album, Riot Act, in 2002. Pearl Jam's contribution to the 2003 film Big Fish, titled "Man of the Hour," was nominated for a Golden Globe Award in 2004. The band's eighth studio album, the eponymous Pearl Jam, was released in 2006. The band released its ninth studio album, Backspacer, in 2009, its tenth studio album, Lightning Bolt, in 2013, and its eleventh studio album, Gigaton, in 2020.

Vedder uses the pseudonym "Jerome Turner" on Pearl Jam records for his non-musical contributions such as design and artwork. He has also used the pseudonym "Wes C. Addle" ("West Seattle").

Other musical projects

Soundtrack contributions
Vedder has contributed solo material to several soundtracks and compilations, including the soundtracks for the films Dead Man Walking (1995), I Am Sam (2001), A Brokedown Melody (2004), Body of War (2007), and Reign Over Me (2007). Vedder collaborated with Pakistani musician Nusrat Fateh Ali Khan for his contributions to the Dead Man Walking soundtrack. He covered the Beatles' "You've Got to Hide Your Love Away" for the I Am Sam soundtrack. Vedder wrote "Man of the Hour" that Pearl Jam recorded for Tim Burton's Big Fish Soundtrack (2003). Vedder wrote two songs for the 2007 feature documentary, Body of War, produced by Ellen Spiro and Phil Donahue: "No More" (a song referring to the Iraq War) and "Long Nights". Vedder and the supergroup the Million Dollar Bashers, which includes members from Sonic Youth, Wilco, and Bob Dylan's band, covered Dylan's "All Along the Watchtower" for the biopic film, I'm Not There (2007). Pearl Jam recorded a cover version of The Who's song "Love, Reign o'er Me" for the film Reign Over Me, which takes its title from the song. In 2010, Vedder recorded a new song, "Better Days", which appeared on the soundtrack to the 2010 film Eat Pray Love. Vedder contributed original music for the soundtrack to the 2021 film Flag Day, which also featured the musical debut of Vedder's daughter Olivia on lead vocals in the first single, "My Father’s Daughter", written by Vedder and Glen Hansard.

Into the Wild

Vedder contributed an album's worth of songs to the soundtrack for the 2007 film, Into the Wild. The soundtrack was released on September 18, 2007, through J Records. It includes covers of the Indio song "Hard Sun" and the Jerry Hannan song "Society". Vedder said that having to write songs based on a narrative "simplified things". He said, "There were fewer choices. The story was there and the scenes were there." Vedder's songs written for the film feature a folk sound. Thom Jurek of AllMusic called the soundtrack a "collection of folksy, rootsy tunes where rock & roll makes fleeting appearances." Vedder won a 2008 Golden Globe Award for the song "Guaranteed" from Into the Wild. He was also nominated for a Golden Globe Award for his contributions to the film's original score. At the 2008 Grammy Awards, "Guaranteed" received a nomination for Best Song Written for a Motion Picture, Television or Other Visual Media. "Guaranteed" was also nominated a 2008 World Soundtrack Award in the category of Best Original Song Written Directly for a Film. At the 2009 Grammy Awards, "Rise" received a nomination for Best Rock Vocal Performance, Solo.

Vedder promoted the Into the Wild soundtrack with his first solo tour, which began in April 2008. The April leg of the tour, dubbed the "April Fools Tour", began in Vancouver, British Columbia, Canada at The Centre on April 2, 2008, and was composed of ten dates focusing on the West Coast of the United States. Vedder continued the tour with a second leg in August 2008 composed of fourteen dates focusing on the East Coast and Canada. The second leg of the tour began in Boston, Massachusetts at the Boston Opera House and ended in Chicago, Illinois at the Auditorium Theatre. In June 2009, Vedder followed his 2008 solo tour with another solo tour composed of fourteen dates focusing on the Eastern United States and Hawaii, which began in Albany, New York at the Palace Theatre and continued through to Honolulu at the Hawaii Theatre.

Ukulele Songs
Vedder released his second solo album titled Ukulele Songs, a collection of original songs and covers performed on the ukulele, on May 31, 2011. The first single from the album, "Longing to Belong", was released through digital retailers on March 21. A live DVD titled Water on the Road, featuring live performances from two shows in Washington, D.C. during Vedder's 2008 solo tour, was released the same day as Ukulele Songs.

Earthling
In September 2021, Vedder released the single "Long Way", taken from his third studio album Earthling. This was followed by "The Haves" on November 18, 2021, and "Brother the Cloud" on January 14, 2022. "Long Way" and "The Haves" have been released as a limited edition 7" vinyl. To tour the album, Vedder assembled a backing band dubbed "The Earthlings", which includes Glen Hansard on rhythm guitar and backing vocals, Josh Klinghoffer on guitar, keyboard and vocals, Chad Smith on drums, Chris Chaney on bass, and guitarist Andrew Watt. Watt also produced the album.

Collaborations
In addition to playing with Pearl Jam and Temple of the Dog, Vedder has performed or recorded with numerous well-known artists. He has appeared on albums by the Who, Ramones, Neil Young, R.E.M., Neil Finn, Bad Religion, Mark Seymour, Cat Power, Mike Watt, Fastbacks, Wellwater Conspiracy, Jack Irons, and John Doe, and has also recorded with the Strokes, Nusrat Fateh Ali Khan, Supersuckers, Susan Sarandon, and Zeke. In the months of June and July 2006, Vedder made live performances jamming with Tom Petty and the Heartbreakers, singing on many tracks, including lead vocals on "The Waiting" and backing vocals on "American Girl". Vedder performed the songs "Break on Through (To the Other Side)", "Light My Fire" and "Roadhouse Blues" with the remaining members of the Doors at the 1993 Rock and Roll Hall of Fame induction ceremony. He also performed with R.E.M. at the 2007 Rock and Roll Hall of Fame induction ceremony and with the Stooges at the 2010 Rock and Roll Hall of Fame induction ceremony.  Vedder made a guest appearance at the Ramones' last show on August 6, 1996, at the Palace in Hollywood.

In film
Vedder had a brief acting cameo in the 1992 movie, Singles, along with Jeff Ament and Stone Gossard of Pearl Jam. He appeared as himself, playing drums in lead actor Matt Dillon's backing band, Citizen Dick. He was also interviewed for the 1996 grunge documentary, Hype! He appears in the 2003 Ramones documentary, End of the Century: The Story of the Ramones. In 2007, he made a cameo as himself in the comedy film, Walk Hard: The Dewey Cox Story. He appears in the 2007 Tom Petty documentary, Runnin' Down a Dream, the 2008 political documentary, Slacker Uprising, and the 2009 Howard Zinn documentary, The People Speak, based upon A People's History of the United States. He was featured in the 2008 Greg Kohs documentary, Song Sung Blue, performing with Lightning and Thunder. He had a one-scene cameo in the second episode of the second season of the IFC television show Portlandia. He also appears in the 2012 documentary West of Memphis,  protesting against the case. Vedder made an appearance in the season 3 episode 16 of David Lynch's Twin Peaks Aug 2017.  He was referred to by his birth name, Edward Louis Severson.

The character of Jackson Maine in the movie 'A Star is Born' was influenced by Eddie Vedder. Bradley Cooper, who wrote the screenplay, produced, directed and starred in the film as Jackson Maine, hung out with Vedder for four or five days to get some tips from him about the character.

Activism
Discussing his views on current issues in the United States, Vedder said, "People on death row, the treatment of animals, women's right to choose. So much in America is based on religious fundamentalist Christianity. Grow up! This is the modern world!" In 1992, Spin printed an article by Vedder, titled "Reclamation", which detailed his views on abortion. Vedder and Pearl Jam have consistently supported abortion rights and performed at Rock for Choice in 1994. During the band's appearance on MTV Unplugged in 1992, Vedder stood up on his stool during the instrumental break of the song "Porch" and wrote "PRO-CHOICE" on his left arm with a magic marker.

Vedder was outspoken in support of Green Party presidential candidate Ralph Nader in 2000 and played at Green Party super rallies in Chicago and New York City. Pearl Jam played a series of concerts on the 2004 Vote for Change tour, supporting the candidacy of John Kerry for U.S. president. Vedder told Rolling Stone magazine, "I supported Ralph Nader in 2000, but it's a time of crisis. We have to get a new administration in." In 2005, during Pearl Jam's first South American tour, Vedder stated, to the immediate and effusive support from the crowd in Rio de Janeiro, that "next time we come to Brazil, the world will be a better place to live, as George Bush will no longer be the President of the United States." Vedder supported the candidacy of Barack Obama in 2008 and 2012, Bernie Sanders in the 2016 and 2020 primaries, Hillary Clinton in 2016, and Joe Biden in 2020 against Donald Trump.

In his spare time, Vedder is a surfer and active in surf-related conservation efforts, most notably The Surfrider Foundation. In 1993, Vedder supported fellow Surfrider Foundation member/environmentalist, Aaron Ahearn who had gone AWOL from the United States Navy in protest of the Navy's at sea dumping policies. Vedder along with Pearl Jam performed a concert in San Francisco, donating over $3,000 to the legal fee for Ahearn.

Vedder shows his support for environmental activism by sporting an Earth First! tattoo on his right calf. The logo is of a pipe wrench crossed with a stone hammer.

Vedder was a longtime and outspoken supporter for the Free the West Memphis Three movement, a cause that advocated the release of three young men who were convicted in 1994 of the gruesome murders of three boys in West Memphis, Arkansas. In an interview with Larry King on December 19, 2007, Damien Echols, who was then on death row for the murders, said that Vedder had been the "greatest friend a person could have" and that he had collaborated with him while in prison. The song "Army Reserve" on Pearl Jam's 2006 self-titled album features a lyrical collaboration between Vedder and Echols. On August 19, 2011, Vedder and Natalie Maines attended the release hearing of the West Memphis Three.

Vedder is a gun control activist and has performed at benefit anti-gun violence concerts and participated on the 2019 Gun Sense Forum.

Musical style and influences

Critic Jim DeRogatis describes Vedder's vocals as a "Jim Morrison-like vocal growl". Greg Prato of AllMusic said, "With his hard-hitting and often confessional lyrical style and Jim Morrison-esque baritone, Vedder also became one of the most copied lead singers in all of rock." Vedder has inducted the Doors, Neil Young, the Ramones, and R.E.M. into the Rock and Roll Hall of Fame, and in his induction speeches he has cited them all as influences. Other influences that Vedder has cited include Pete Townshend and The Who (which the singer considers to be his favorite band of all time), The Beatles, Bruce Springsteen, Pink Floyd, Talking Heads, Fugazi and The Clash.

Vedder's lyrical topics range from personal ("Alive", from Ten; "Better Man", from Vitalogy) to social and political concerns ("Even Flow", from Ten; "World Wide Suicide", from Pearl Jam). His lyrics have often invoked the use of storytelling and have included themes of freedom, individualism, and sympathy for troubled individuals. Other recurring themes include the use of water metaphors, as well as the idea of leaving everything behind to start again (featured in such songs as "Rearviewmirror", from Vs.; "MFC", from Yield; "Evacuation", from Binaural; and "Gone", from Pearl Jam).

Although best known as a vocalist, Vedder also plays guitar on many Pearl Jam songs, beginning with the Vs. songs "Rearviewmirror" and "Elderly Woman Behind the Counter in a Small Town". When the band started, Gossard and McCready were clearly designated as rhythm and lead guitarists, respectively. The dynamic began to change when Vedder started to play more rhythm guitar during the Vitalogy era. McCready said in 2006, "Even though there are three guitars, I think there's maybe more room now. Stone will pull back and play a two-note line and Ed will do a power chord thing, and I fit into all that." Vedder's guitar playing helped the band's sound progress toward a more stripped-down style; the songs "Rearviewmirror" and "Corduroy" (from Vitalogy) feature Vedder's raw, punk-influenced guitar playing. As he had more influence on the band's sound, Vedder sought to make the band's musical output less catchy. He said, "I felt that with more popularity, we were going to be crushed, our heads were going to pop like grapes." He has also contributed performances on the ukulele, harmonica, accordion, and electric sitar to various Pearl Jam recordings.

Live performances

Throughout Pearl Jam's career, Vedder has interacted with the crowd during the band's concerts. Early in Pearl Jam's existence, Vedder and the band became known for their intense live performances. Vedder participated in stage diving as well as crowd surfing. During the early part of Pearl Jam's career, Vedder was known to climb the stage lighting rig and hang from the stage roof. Looking back at this time, Vedder said, "It's hard for us to watch early performances, even though that's when people think we were on fire and young. Playing music for as long as I had been playing music and then getting a shot at making a record and at having an audience and stuff, it's just like an untamed force...a different kind of energy. And I find it kind of hard to watch those early performances because it's so just fucking, semi-testosterone-fueled or whatever. But it didn't come from jock mentality. It came from just being let out of the gates."

Vedder began incorporating social commentary and political criticism into his lyrics and performances early in his career with Pearl Jam. He usually comments on politics between songs, often to criticize U.S. foreign policy. During Pearl Jam's 1992 appearance on MTV Unplugged, Vedder stood atop his stool, took out a marker pen, and wrote "pro-choice" down his arm in large letters when the band performed the song "Porch". During Pearl Jam's 2007 Lollapalooza headlining show, Vedder and the band played a song telling the crowd in Chicago to boycott the oil company B.P. Amoco because they had been polluting Lake Michigan.

Vedder is known to use a Mike Lull - modified, vintage Fender Telecaster that features a single coil pickup in the bridge position and a P-90 pickup in the neck position, as well as various stickers as a tribute to The Who; furthermore, he is known to use three vintage Fender Tweed amplifiers (including a 1959 Deluxe and a 1957 Custom Twin). His two main acoustic guitars are a 1930s - era Martin 00-17 and a vintage Gibson Pete Townshend Signature SJ - 200.

Legacy

Lamenting the constant waning of rock 'n roll from the music scene, Bono, in 2017, expounded that "Rage" is the fundamental component of rock 'n roll and said, "Some great rock’n’roll tends to have that, which is why the Who were such a great band. Or Pearl Jam. Eddie has that rage."

Vedder has been ranked at number 7 on a list of "Best Lead Singers of All Time", compiled by Rolling Stone. Loudwire put him at number 35 on their Top 66 Hard Rock + Heavy Metal Frontmen of all time. He has been ranked at number 5 on a list of "Singer with the Most Unique Voice", compiled by Rolling Stone. 
Other singers like Roger Daltrey of the Who and Bruce Dickinson of Iron Maiden have praised him for his singing ability. Hit Parader magazine placed him at number 23 on their list of the "Top 100 Metal Vocalists of All Time". His solo album Into the Wild was ranked at no. 20 on the list of Top 20 Rock 'n' Roll Solo Albums by Consequence of Sound.

Personal life
Vedder attended San Dieguito High School, now called San Dieguito Academy. Vedder donated proceeds from a 2006 Pearl Jam concert in San Diego toward the construction of a theater for the school in the name of his former drama teacher, Clayton E. Liggett. Liggett was Vedder's mentor in high school. Vedder wrote the song "Long Road" (from Merkin Ball) upon hearing of Liggett's death in 1995.

While living in the basement of Pearl Jam manager Kelly Curtis' house in Seattle in the early 90s, Vedder was roommates with Alice in Chains guitarist and vocalist Jerry Cantrell. Vedder was also friends with Alice in Chains' lead singer Layne Staley, and wrote the song "4/20/02" (from Lost Dogs) on the night that he found out about Staley's death, on April 20, 2002 (though Staley had actually died over two weeks earlier on April 5, his body was found on April 19). Vedder also paid tribute to Staley during a Pearl Jam show in Chicago on August 22, 2016, which would have been Staley's 49th birthday; "It's the birthday of a guy called Layne Staley tonight, and we're thinking of him tonight too. 49 years old", Vedder told the crowd before dedicating the song "Man of the Hour" to his late friend.

In 1994, Vedder married Hovercraft bass player Beth Liebling, whom he was dating since he was a teenager, circa 1984. Vedder was Hovercraft's drummer during their opening slot for Mike Watt's U.S. tour in 1995. The couple divorced in September 2000. In an interview published in the June 29, 2006 edition of Rolling Stone magazine, Vedder said that his divorce from Liebling had devastated him. The divorce happened around the same time as the biggest tragedy of Pearl Jam's career, when nine fans were crushed to death during the band's set at the Roskilde Festival in Denmark on June 30, 2000. In an interview with Chris Cornell's daughter Lily in 2020, Vedder explained that their show started on a high because they had just been told about her birth, until about 40 minutes into their performance when the tragedy happened. Vedder revealed that Pete Townshend helped him through the early stages of dealing with the tragedy.

On September 18, 2010, Vedder married his longtime girlfriend, model Jill McCormick, whom he had been dating since 2000. They have two daughters, Olivia, born in 2004, and Harper, born in 2008. In 2011, McCormick appeared in the music video for Vedder's solo single, "Longing to Belong". In 2014, Vedder and McCormick co-founded the EB Research Partnership, a non-profit organization dedicated to finding a cure for the genetic skin disorder epidermolysis bullosa. They have raised over $25 million to fund research to find a cure.

Vedder was a close friend of the late Soundgarden and Audioslave frontman, Chris Cornell. Aside from Vedder's Pearl Jam bandmates, Cornell was one of the first people Vedder met after moving to Seattle in 1990. The two were neighbors for a while and shared vocal duties in Temple of the Dog. In the 2009 book Grunge Is Dead: The Oral History of Seattle Rock Music, Soundgarden manager Susan Silver recalled that Cornell carried Vedder onstage on his shoulders at Pearl Jam's second show in Seattle (the band was known as Mookie Blaylock at the time): "Everyone was still reeling from [Andrew Wood]'s death... The band came on and Chris carried Eddie onto the stage – he was on his shoulders. It was one of those super powerful moments, where it was all a big healing for everybody. He came out as this guy who had all the credibility in the world – in terms of people in Seattle – and Malfunkshun and Mother Love Bone were loved bands. Andy was such an endearing personality. It was a hard thing to do – to show up after people die. And Chris bringing Eddie out, and pointing at him, as much Pearl Jam lead guitarist Mike McCready recalled that Cornell had helped welcome the "'super, super shy'" Vedder to Seattle: "He was like, 'Hey, welcome to Seattle. I love Jeff [Ament] and Stone [Gossard]. I give you my blessing". From then on [Vedder] was more relaxed. It was one of the coolest things I saw Chris do'". In a 2009 interview with Uncut magazine, Vedder stated that Cornell is "the best singer that we've got on the planet". About the impact that Cornell had in his life, Vedder told a crowd in Alpine Valley before performing "Hunger Strike" with him in September 2011; "I had no idea how he would affect my life and my views on music and my views on friendship and what a big impact he would have. These guys [the other members of Pearl Jam] know him much longer than me and his impact is profound". The friendship between Vedder and Cornell is featured in the 2011 documentary Pearl Jam Twenty. During his solo concert in London on June 6, 2017, Vedder talked for the first time about Cornell since his death on May 18, 2017, saying that "he wasn't just a friend, he was someone I looked up to like my older brother" and "I will live with those memories in my heart and I will love him forever".

Vedder is a friend of The Who guitarist Pete Townshend, who discouraged Vedder from retiring in 1993. In late 2007, Vedder wrote the foreword to a new Pete Townshend biography, Who Are You: The Life of Pete Townshend. The book was published in the UK in March 2008 and in the U.S. in October 2008. Vedder was a close friend of the late Ramones guitarist Johnny Ramone, with Vedder being at his side when he died. Since Ramone's death, Vedder and Pearl Jam have played the Ramones' "I Believe in Miracles" regularly at live shows. While driving home from Ramone's funeral, Vedder wrote the lyrics for the Pearl Jam song "Life Wasted" (from Pearl Jam).

He also has paddled outrigger canoes on occasion and in 2005 was nearly lost at sea trying to paddle from Moloka'i to Oahu.

Vedder frequently writes songs and lyrics that question religious authority. Vedder is a Chicago Bulls and Chicago Bears fan and a long-time, die-hard fan of the Chicago Cubs. In November 1993, Vedder and White Sox pitcher Jack McDowell were involved in a barroom brawl in New Orleans, Louisiana that resulted in Vedder being arrested for public drunkenness and disturbing the peace. Vedder sang the national anthem before the third game of the 1998 NBA Finals in Chicago, and has sung "Take Me Out to the Ball Game" at six Cubs games, including Game 5 of the 2016 World Series. In 2007, a few days before performing with Pearl Jam in Chicago for Lollapalooza, he threw out the first pitch at Wrigley Field, the home of the Cubs. Vedder wrote a song at the request of former Cubs shortstop and first baseman Ernie Banks paying tribute to the Cubs called "All the Way". The day after the Cubs won the 2016 World Series, the Cubs' official Twitter account posted a montage video backed by Vedder's song in a tribute to Cubs fans.

The singer is also a great admirer of the late American science fiction author Kurt Vonnegut. During an interview with Uncut Magazine, he stated that the novel Cat's Cradle is his favorite book of all time.

Discography

Solo discography

Extended plays

Singles

Music videos
 "Hard Sun" (2007)
 "Guaranteed" (2008)
 "No More" (2008)
 "Better Days" (2010)
 "You're True" (2011)
 "Longing to Belong" (2011)
 "Can't Keep" (2011)
 "Sleeping by Myself" (2012)
 "Matter of Time" (2020)
 "Say Hi" (2020)
"Long Way" (2021)
"The Haves" (2021)
"Brother the Cloud" (2022)

Studio contributions and collaborations

Live contributions and collaborations

Guest appearances

Temple of the Dog discography

Pearl Jam discography

Filmography

Television
Performer and actor

Film
Performer and actor

 *denotes performance with Pearl Jam
 **note: "Animal" performed with Pearl Jam and "Rockin' in the Free World" performed with Neil Young & Pearl Jam
 ^note: In the acceptance speech, Eddie notoriously states, "I don't know what this means, I don't think it means anything."
 ^^note: Vedder also performed the songs: "Mary Anne with the Shaky Hand" and "Getting in Tune" with the Who, but they were not released on the DVD.

2017 Documentary, "Let's Play Two" featuring Eddie Vedder and Pearl Jam. Can be found on Amazon Prime and was directed by Danny Clinch. Concert documentary centering around Pearl Jams August 2016 shows at Wrigley Field. <https://www.imdb.com/title/tt7435110/>

Awards and nominations

References

External links

 
 
 
 

1964 births
Living people
20th-century American guitarists
20th-century American male singers
20th-century American singers
21st-century American male singers
21st-century American singers
Activists from California
Alternative rock guitarists
Alternative rock singers
American alternative rock musicians
American atheists
American baritones
American feminists
American male guitarists
American people of Danish descent
American people of Dutch descent
American people of German descent
American rock singers
American socialists
American ukulele players
Feminist musicians
Golden Globe Award-winning musicians
Grammy Award winners
Grunge musicians
Guitarists from California
Guitarists from Illinois
J Records artists
Male feminists
Musicians from Evanston, Illinois
Musicians from San Diego
Pearl Jam members
Rhythm guitarists
Singers from California
Temple of the Dog members
Hovercraft (band) members